Petr Gazdík (born 26 June 1974) is a Czech politician who has been member of the Chamber of Deputies since 2010. He served as Minister of Education, Youth and Sports of the Czech Republic in the Cabinet of Petr Fiala from  December 2021 to June 2022 and was a leader of Mayors and Independents party from 2009 to 2014 and 2016 to 2019. Previously he was a mayor of Suchá Loz. He is married and he has four children.

On 19 June 2022 Gazdík announced his resignation as Minister of Education, Youth and Sports in connection with his ties with businessman and lobbyist , he also resigned as vice-president of STAN.

References

External links
Profile on the website of Chamber of Deputies of the Parliament of the Czech republic
Official site

1974 births
Living people
Members of the Chamber of Deputies of the Czech Republic (2017–2021)
Mayors of places in the Czech Republic
Mayors and Independents politicians
People from Uherské Hradiště
Members of the Chamber of Deputies of the Czech Republic (2010–2013)
Members of the Chamber of Deputies of the Czech Republic (2013–2017)
Members of the Chamber of Deputies of the Czech Republic (2021–2025)
Mayors and Independents Government ministers
Leaders of the Mayors and Independents
Education ministers of the Czech Republic
Masaryk University alumni